Hebei Finance University, formerly known as Hebei Finance College, is located in Baoding, Hebei Province, China. The university currently has an enrollment of 11,993, including 3,300 graduates and 8,600 undergraduates.

History 

Started on September 28, 1952, the former People's Bank of China directly under the financial institutions in North China is the only considerable size and distinctive financial professional characteristics of the economic class institutions of higher learning. Known as the reputation of "Whampoa Military Academy" in the north, northwest Chinese financial sector. In 2000 it was transferred to the People's Government of Hebei Province Education Department, the implementation of the central and local governments to build a local-based management system. School approved by the Ministry of Education in 2007, was promoted to the colleges - Hebei Finance College, was upgraded in 2011 for the master's degree institutions.

Campus

The University campus covers an area of over 218 acres. It is well equipped with first-class facilities, notably in the areas of Finance and Economics. The University library has a collection of 830,000 books and 1,100 periodicals published at home and abroad.

Departments

Finance Department 
Administration Department 
Account Department 
Insurance Department 
Economics and Trading Department 
Business Foreign Language Department 
Information Administration and Engineering Department 
Law Department

Social Science Department 
Physical Education Department 
Basic Department 
Continuing Education Department
Foreign Language Department
International Education College

References

HFU

Universities and colleges in Hebei
Business schools in China